The 1993–94 Lebanese Premier League season was the 34th season of the Lebanese Premier League, the top Lebanese professional league for association football clubs in the country, established in 1934.

Ansar, the defending champions, won their sixth consecutive—and overall—Lebanese Premier League title.

League table

External links
RSSSF

Leb
1993–94 in Lebanese football
Lebanese Premier League seasons